Scooby-Doo, Where Are You! is a Saturday morning cartoon produced by Hanna-Barbera.

Series overview

Episodes

Season 1 (1969–70)

Season 2 (1970)

See also 
 Lost Mysteries

References 

Lists of Scooby-Doo television series episodes
Lists of American children's animated television series episodes